Reuben Bernhard "Jack" Frost (April 26, 1907 – February 17, 1989) was an American football, basketball, and baseball coach and college athletics administrator. He served as the head football coach at Bemidji State University in Bemidji, Minnesota from 1935 to 1937, compiling a record of 7–14–1. Frost was also the head basketball coach at Bemidji State from 1935 to 1942 and in 1946–47 and at South Dakota State University from 1947 to 1954, amassing a career college basketball coaching record of 166–134.

Head coaching record

Football

References

External links
 

1907 births
1989 deaths
Basketball coaches from North Dakota
Bemidji State Beavers football coaches
Bemidji State Beavers men's basketball coaches
Luther Norse football players
South Dakota State Jackrabbits athletic directors
South Dakota State Jackrabbits baseball coaches
South Dakota State Jackrabbits men's basketball coaches
People from Eddy County, North Dakota
Players of American football from North Dakota